Kāveh Golestān Taghavi Shirazi (8 July 1950 – 2 April 2003) was an Iranian photojournalist and artist. In 1988 he took the first pictures of the aftermath of the Halabja chemical attack during the Iran–Iraq War.

Early life and education 

Golestan was the son of the Iranian filmmaker and writer Ebrahim Golestan and the brother of Lili Golestan, translator and the owner-artistic director of the Golestan Gallery in Tehran, Iran.

He was educated at Millfield School in Somerset, England.

Life and work
In 1988, working as a freelance photographer, he took the first pictures of the aftermath of the Halabja chemical attack during the Iran–Iraq War. He was awarded the Robert Capa Gold Medal for his work covering the 1979 revolution for Time.

His picture was shown, among many other people, in the end credits of Roger Waters: The Wall.

Death
On 2 April 2003 Golestān was killed, aged 53, as a result of stepping on a land mine while working for the BBC in Kifri, Iraq. He is buried in a cemetery in the east of Tehran.

Personal life
Kaveh was married to Hengameh Golestan; they had a son, Mehrak who is a musician.

See also
 Iranian modern and contemporary art

References

External links
 "Index on Censorship: Tribute to Kaveh Golestan", 3 April 2003.
 Kaveh Golestan's collection of the Iranian Revolution photographs, Iranian Artists' site "Kargah".
 Kaveh Golestan's collection of the Iran-Iraq War photographs, Iranian Artists' site "Kargah".
 "Window on an Era: A Qajar Royal Album", with an introduction by Kaveh Golestan (2003), "Kargah" (selected photographs from a private album of Nasser al-Din Shah Qajar).
 Kaveh Golestan's Funeral, A photo-reportage, Iranian Artists' site "Kargah".
 Audio slideshow (6 min 7 sec). The person speaking is Ms Hengāmeh Golestān, wife of Kaveh Golestan, who has organized an exhibition of the photographs by Kaveh Golestan. She is a professional photograph herself and lives in London.

1950 births
2003 deaths
People educated at Millfield
Iranian photojournalists
War photographers killed while covering the Iraq War
Landmine victims